Nikola Manojlović may refer to:
 Nikola Manojlović (handballer)
 Nikola Manojlović (basketball)